Onur Ural (born 22 February 1997) is a Turkish professional footballer who plays as a right back for İskenderunspor on loan from Kasımpaşa.

Professional career
Ural made his professional debut with Kasımpaşa in a 1-1 Süper Lig tie with Erzurumspor on 27 October 2018. On 9 January 2019, Ural joined İstanbulspor on loan for the rest of the season.

References

External links
 
 
 

1997 births
Footballers from Istanbul
Living people
Turkish footballers
Association football fullbacks
Kasımpaşa S.K. footballers
İstanbulspor footballers
İskenderun FK footballers
Süper Lig players
TFF First League players
TFF Second League players
TFF Third League players